Poplar Hall is a historic plantation house located at Norfolk, Virginia. It was built about 1760, and is a two-story, five-bay, Georgian style brick dwelling. It is covered with a slate gable roof and has interior end chimneys.  It features a central one-bay dwarf portico and a low, hipped roof topped by a three-bay cupola.  Both entrances are sheltered by a dwarf portico.  A one-story brick wing was added about 1860, a frame addition in 1955, and a one-story frame wing in 1985.  Also on the property is a contributing dairy. The house was built for Thurmer Hoggard, a planter and ship's carpenter who developed a private shipyard on the site.

It was listed on the National Register of Historic Places in 1997.

References

Plantation houses in Virginia
Houses on the National Register of Historic Places in Virginia
Georgian architecture in Virginia
Houses completed in 1760
Houses in Norfolk, Virginia
National Register of Historic Places in Norfolk, Virginia